Wilson's & North Eastern Railway Shipping Co. Ltd was formed in March 1906 in England by the family who controlled Wilson Line of Hull and the North Eastern Railway Company.

History

Overview

At the beginning of the 20th century Wilson's were rapidly becoming one of the largest private shipping operations in the World and had further expanded by taking over the 23 ship fleet of another U.K. owner with similar North Sea operations. Through that takeover they had also acquired the agency for DFDS the leading Danish owner who also had services which either directly or indirectly competed with their own operation. At the same time the Wilson family were conscious of the need to maintain their relationship with the North Eastern Railway (N.E.R.) who were essential for the satisfactory movement of goods to and from the ports that Wilson's served, road haulage still being in its infancy, and who held operating rights over some of the same routes as themselves although they hadn't exercised those rights. The joint venture rationalised the Wilson services from the port of Hull and shipping interests of the N.E.R. whilst securing the vital rail access that the N.E.R. could provide.

Wilson's initially transferred five ships into the new operation in March 1906 : "Cito", "Dynamo", "Juno", "Bruno" and "Hero". Two further vessels "Otto" and "Truro" were added later.

The joint operation was further rationalised when it merged with three other operators to form the Associated Humber Lines in 1935 which brought together the services being operated by the railway companies through the ports of Hull, Grimsby and Goole in the River Humber.

Chronology
 1903 – Thos. Wilson had taken over the 23 ship fleet of Bailey & Leetham which brought with it the agency for the United Steamship Company (DFDS) of Denmark. This agency presented problems for Wilson's as it overlapped some of their own activities and brought them into competition with railway shipping interests which were so vital in the operation of their existing business.
 1905 – Wilsons sought a solution to the Hull services problem and a joint venture was proposed. The negotiations were led by Charles Wilson (Lord Nunburnholme) and his brother Arthur Wilson who was also a Director of the N.E.R.
 1906 – Joint company formed in March to operate services from Hull. In the same year Thomas Wilson Sons & Co. took control of local shipbuilders Earle's Shipbuilding.
 1923 – January – The company came under control of the London and North Eastern Railway.
 1935 – May – the company was merged with other interests to form the Associated Humber Lines.
 1957 – Final two ships "Selby" and "Harrogate" (1925) were sold and the company ceased to trade.

Routes

Hull to Hamburg ; Antwerp / Ghent ; and Dunkirk.

Livery
Funnel : Red with black top with thin white dividing line.

Hull : Wilson dark green with red boot topping.

Passenger / cargo vessels operated

References

Bibliography

Transport in Lincolnshire
Shipping companies of England
Transport in Yorkshire
Defunct shipping companies of the United Kingdom